The large tree finch (Camarhynchus psittacula) is a species of bird in the Darwin's finch group of the tanager family Thraupidae.
It is endemic to the Galapagos Islands.

Its natural habitats are subtropical or tropical dry forests and subtropical or tropical moist montane forests.

References

large tree finch
Endemic birds of the Galápagos Islands
large tree finch
Taxonomy articles created by Polbot
Taxobox binomials not recognized by IUCN